The men's triple jump event  at the 1983 European Athletics Indoor Championships was held on March 5, 1983.

Results

References

Triple jump at the European Athletics Indoor Championships
Triple